Hsanotherium is an extinct genus of early ungulate from the middle Eocene, described in 2000 in the Pondaung Formation, Myanmar.

It was originally assigned to Anthracobunidae (formerly considered proboscideans, now perissodactyls) making it the first of that family to be discovered outside India and Pakistan and also the smallest. However, the authors of a 2014 cladistic study regard it as more similar to medium-sized bunodont artiodactyls, such as Haqueina.

References 

 DUCROCQ S.; AUNG NAING SOE; BO B.; BENAMMI M.; CHAIMANEE Y.; TUN T.; THEINE T.; JAEGER J.-J.; First record of an Anthracobunidae (Mammalia, ?Tethytheria) from the Eocene of the Pondaung Formation, Myanmar, Comptes rendus de l'Académie des sciences. Série 2. Sciences de la terre et des planètes  (C. r. Acad. sci., Sér. 2, Sci. terre planet.), 2000, vol. 330, no10, pp. 725–730

Fossil taxa described in 2000
Eocene mammals of Asia
Prehistoric odd-toed ungulates